The Dniester Sanatorium is the oldest health resort in Camenca, Transnistria, Moldova. Founded immediately after World War II, in what was then the Moldavian SSR, the sanatorium is still open to the public. It is located on the banks of the Dniester river in the North of region, near the town of Camenca.  It offers therapeutic treatment, most notably ampelotherapy which is described as treatment by grape juice and wine. The resort includes a large cinema, a library and other recreational facilities.

References

Economy of Transnistria
Hospitals in Transnistria